The Heimersheimer Bach is a roughly ten-kilometre-long stream and tributary of the Selz in the German region of Rhenish Hesse.

See also
List of rivers of Rhineland-Palatinate

References 

Rivers of Rhineland-Palatinate
Rhenish Hesse
Rivers of Germany